The 1939 Ladies Open Championships was held at the Queen's Club, West Kensington in London from 28 February – 6 March 1939. Margot Lumb won her fifth consecutive title by defeating Susan Noel in the final. Due to the outbreak of World War II, Margot Lumb was unable to defend her title and missed the opportunity to increase her number of victories over the next seven years.

Seeds

Draw and results

First round

+ denotes seed

Second round

Third round

Quarter-finals

Semi-finals

Final

References

Women's British Open Squash Championships
Women's British Open Squash Championships
Women's British Open Squash Championships
Squash competitions in London
British Open Squash Championships
Women's British Open Squash Championships
Women's British Open Squash Championships